The list of shipwrecks in August 1877 includes ships sunk, foundered, grounded, or otherwise lost during August 1877.

1 August

2 August

3 August

5 August

6 August

7 August

8 August

9 August

10 August

11 August

12 August

13 August

14 August

15 August

16 August

17 August

18 August

19 August

20 August

21 August

22 August

23 August

24 August

25 August

26 August

27 August

28 August

29 August

30 August

31 August

Unknown date

{{shipwreck list item
|ship=Thyra, andHenry Bolckow 
|flag=
|desc=The steamships collided off Falsterbo, Sweden and were both severely damaged. Both vessels put in to Falsterbo. Thyra was on a voyage from Königsberg, Germany to Bordeaux, Gironde, France.
}}

References

Bibliography
Ingram, C. W. N., and Wheatley, P. O., (1936) Shipwrecks: New Zealand disasters 1795–1936.'' Dunedin, NZ: Dunedin Book Publishing Association.

1877-08
Maritime incidents in August 1877